Jafarabad (also Romanized as Ja‘farābād) is a village in Cham Kuh Rural District, Bagh-e Bahadoran District, Lenjan County, Isfahan Province, Iran. At the 2006 census, its population was 232, in 49 families.

References 

Populated places in Lenjan County